John M. Pattison (June 13, 1847 – June 18, 1906) was an American Democratic politician from Ohio. Pattison was for five months the 43rd governor of Ohio, serving for a shorter period than any other person elected to the office before his death.

Biography

Pattison was born near Owensville, Ohio. He joined the Union Army during the American Civil War in 1864. After the war ended, Pattison attended Ohio Wesleyan University, graduating in 1869. He graduated from Cincinnati Law School in 1872, and was admitted to the bar in 1872. Pattison briefly served in the Ohio House of Representatives in 1873 before working as an executive at an insurance company. Pattison was elected to the United States House of Representatives in 1890 after briefly serving in the Ohio State Senate. He served one term from 1891 to 1893, but lost an 1892 bid for re-election. Pattison was elected governor in 1905. He entered office in January 1906 and served until his death in June.

Pattison attended his inauguration, but returned home ill that day. He never again returned to the executive office. Pattison directed the government from his bed until he died at his home Promont, near Milford, Ohio. His cause of death was Bright's disease.

He is buried in Greenlawn Cemetery in Milford, Ohio.

Pattison was married twice. He married Aletheia Williams, who died leaving three children. Another daughter had died. His second wife was Anna Williams, sister of his first wife.

Pattison was a thirty-second degree Scottish Rite Mason.

In 2004, Pattison Elementary School was built in Milford as John Pattison's namesake. The school educates students in kindergarten through sixth grade. Pattison Park, located on US Highway 50 west of Owensville, is also named in his honor.

Gallery

References

External sources

 Retrieved on 2008-11-05

1847 births
1906 deaths
Democratic Party governors of Ohio
Democratic Party members of the Ohio House of Representatives
Democratic Party Ohio state senators
Union Army soldiers
People from Milford, Ohio
Ohio Wesleyan University alumni
University of Cincinnati College of Law alumni
Deaths from nephritis
19th-century American politicians
20th-century American politicians
Democratic Party members of the United States House of Representatives from Ohio